Why Not may refer to:

Film and TV 
 Why Not? with Shania Twain, an American TV show
 Pourquoi pas! (Why Not!), a 1977 French film starring Sami Frey
 Why Not?, a 2019 short thriller movie directed by Buğra Mert Alkayalar

Music

Albums
 Why Not (George Cables album), 1975
 Why Not!, a 1991 album by saxophonist Houston Person
 Why Not? (Michel Camilo album), 1985, or the title song
 Why Not..., a 1978 album by organist Don Patterson
 Why Not? (Marion Brown album), 1968
 Why Not?, a 1973 album by Ellis
 Y Not, a 2010 album by Ringo Starr
 Y Not Festival, an annual music festival in Derbyshire, England
 Why Not, a 2015 album by Blue Sky Riders

Songs
 "Why Not?" (song), a 2020 single by girl group Loona
 "Why Not" (song), a 2003 song by Hilary Duff
 "Why Not?", a 1970 song by Gentle Giant from the album Gentle Giant

Other uses
 Why Not Model Agency, an Italian modeling agency
 Beach Hotel (Sydney), originally Why Not, an historic pub in Sydney, Australia
 The ? operator in linear logic
 "Why Not?", slogan of the 1989 Baltimore Orioles season

See also
 Whynot (disambiguation)